Richard Almeida de Oliveira  (born 20 March 1989) is a professional footballer who plays as a midfielder for Qarabağ. Born in Brazil, he represents the Azerbaijan national team.

Career
In November 2014, Almeida signed a three-year contract extension with Qarabağ, keeping him at the club till the Summer of 2018. On 24 May 2018, Qarabağ announced that Almeida had been released by the club following expiration of his contract.

On 4 July 2018, Almeida signed contract with FC Astana.

On 21 January 2020, Almeida signed contract with Baniyas Club on a season-long deal.

On 26 October 2020, Zira announced the signing of Almeida on a contract until the end of the season.

On 3 August 2021, Qarabağ announced the return of Almeida on a one-year contract.

Career statistics

International
Statistics accurate as of match played 16 November 2019

As match played 11 October 2018. Scores and results list Azerbaijan's goal tally first.

Honours
Qarabağ
Azerbaijan Premier League (7): 2013–14, 2014–15, 2015–16, 2016–17, 2017–18, 2018–19, 2021–22
Azerbaijan Cup (3): 2014–15, 2015–16, 2016–17
Astana
Kazakhstan Premier League (1): 2018

References

External links
 Profile on official club website

1989 births
Living people
Footballers from São Paulo
Azerbaijani footballers
Azerbaijan international footballers
Azerbaijani expatriate footballers
Brazilian footballers
Brazilian emigrants to Azerbaijan
Association football midfielders
Campeonato Brasileiro Série A players
Campeonato Brasileiro Série B players
Esporte Clube Santo André players
Liga Portugal 2 players
Primeira Liga players
Azerbaijan Premier League players
Kazakhstan Premier League players
UAE Pro League players
Gil Vicente F.C. players
Qarabağ FK players
FC Astana players
Baniyas Club players
Brazilian expatriate footballers
Brazilian expatriate sportspeople in Portugal
Expatriate footballers in Portugal
Brazilian expatriate sportspeople in Azerbaijan
Expatriate footballers in Azerbaijan
Azerbaijani expatriate sportspeople in Kazakhstan
Expatriate footballers in the United Arab Emirates
Brazilian expatriate sportspeople in the United Arab Emirates